"Visa vid vindens ängar" is a summer song written by Mats Paulson, who recorded it on his 1966 album En stad, en morgon. A Lars Lönndahl recording charted at Svensktoppen for one week, on 22 May 1977.

Covers
The song been recorded by Mats Rådberg in 1988, and by Håkan Hellström on the 2002 EP Luften bor i mina steg, a version which charted at Trackslistan.

The Belarusian-Norwegian artist Alexander Rybak also recorded it for his similarly titled album Visa vid vindens ängar, his third released on 15 June 2011 in Norway.

Linda Pira covered it and her version has charted in the Sverigetopplistan Swedish singles chart in February 2015.

References

1966 songs
Swedish-language songs
Swedish songs
Songs written by Mats Paulson
Håkan Hellström songs
Mats Rådberg songs